Phila, sister of Derdas and Machatas of Elimeia, was the first or second wife of Philip II of Macedon.

References
Dicaearchus ap. Aflien. xiii. p. 557, c.
Who's who in the age of Alexander the Great: prosopography of Alexander's empire by Waldemar Heckel 

Ancient Macedonian queens consort
Ancient Elimiotes
Wives of Philip II of Macedon